Gibberula dosmosquises is a species of sea snail, a marine gastropod mollusk, in the family Cystiscidae.

References

dosmosquises
Gastropods described in 2011